The King Faisal Mosque is a mosque in Sharjah, the United Arab Emirates. It is named after the former ruler of Saudi Arabia King Faisal of Saudi Arabia.

History
Construction of the mosque started in 1984, and it was completed and opened to the public on Friday the 23rd of January, 1987. Named after King Faisal of Saudi Arabia, it had been the largest in the Emirate of Sharjah and country. Currently, the Sharjah Mosque in the area of Tay is the largest mosque in the Emirate, and the Sheikh Zayed Mosque is the largest in the nation.

Geography
The mosque is located on King Faisal Road and Al Arouba Street in the central part of Sharjah, near the headquarters of Dubai Islamic Bank in Sharjah, Al Ittihad (Union) Park, the Central Bus Station and Al Jubail Souq.

Structure
The mosque has functions even apart from hosting male and female worshippers. The second floor is occupied by Sharjah's Department of Islamic Affairs and Awqaf, including a general library and offices, adding the library having approximately 7,000 books on Islamic thought and history, modern books on Islamic Sharia and ahadith, in addition to cultural, literary and scientific works. The ground and first floors are for men to pray in, and the basement for women. Near the women's prayer hall is a big place where people may donate clothes for the needy, under the supervision of Sharjah International Charitable Organisation, which also has offices in the building.

See also
 Islam in the United Arab Emirates
 List of mosques in the United Arab Emirates
 List of things named after Saudi kings
 King Faisal Mosque, Islamabad, Pakistan

Notes

References

External links
 King Faisal Mosque (YouTube)
 Azan from King Faisal Mosque in Sharjah, UAE

1987 establishments in the United Arab Emirates
Mosques in Sharjah (city)
Saudi Arabia–United Arab Emirates relations